Yuen Tau Shan is a 375 m high hill in Yuen Long District, Hong Kong.

See also
 List of mountains, peaks and hills in Hong Kong

References

Mountains, peaks and hills of Hong Kong
Yuen Long District